Westerholt is a municipality in the district of Wittmund, in Lower Saxony, Germany.

References

Towns and villages in East Frisia
Wittmund (district)